Tom B. Rosenberg (1947/1948) is an American film producer, co-founder of Beacon Pictures; and founder and chairman of Lakeshore Entertainment. He is a recipient of the 2004 Academy Award for Best Picture for the film Million Dollar Baby.

Biography
Rosenberg grew up on the North Side of Chicago. His father was an alderman of the 44th ward and later served as a Cook County judge. His mother worked in a dress shop and died when Rosenberg was 15. He had one sister who was 15 years his senior. He graduated from Lake View High School and then graduated from the University of Wisconsin at Madison. He then went on to teach at public schools in Chicago and then move to California where he went to the University of California at Berkeley Law School. He then moved to Willow Springs, Missouri where he worked as a lawyer, sold real estate, and helped to build subsidized housing for the elderly. After five years and newly divorced, he moved back to Chicago founded Capital Associates in 1977 with a partner. They built their first development in Decatur, Illinois. Rosenberg went on to build 54 buildings in Illinois, oversaw the largest school construction program in Chicago, and was active in fundraising for mayors Jane Byrne and Richard M. Daley. In 1984, he ran the Midwestern campaign for presidential candidate Walter Mondale. In 1989, he started a film company, Beacon Pictures, with his friend Armyan Bernstein; and their first film was released in 1991, The Commitments, directed by Alan Parker.

In 2004, he sold his real estate assets.

Filmography
He was a producer in all films unless otherwise noted.

Film

Television

Thanks

References

External links
 

Film producers from Illinois
Living people
Businesspeople from Chicago
Producers who won the Best Picture Academy Award
University of Wisconsin–Madison alumni
Year of birth missing (living people)
American real estate businesspeople
American people of Jewish descent
American independent film production company founders